Graham M. Smith (born 1966) is a British political theorist and Associate Professor in Political Theory at the University of Leeds. Smith is known for his research on friendship and its relation to the understanding of the political. He previously taught at Lancaster University and is the co-editor of the online, peer-reviewed, open-access journal AMITY: The Journal of Friendship Studies.

Works
 Confronting Secularism in Europe and India: Legitimacy and Disenchantment in Contemporary Times (co-edited with Brian Black and Gavin Hyman), Bloomsbury (2014).
 Friendship and the Political: Kierkegaard, Nietzsche, Schmitt, Imprint Academic, (2011). 
 Friendship in Politics: Theorizing Amity In and Between States (ed. with Preston King), Routledge, (2008).
 ‘Friendship, State and Nation’ in Friendship and International Relations, eds. Koschut, S. and Oelsner, A. (2014)
 ‘Kierkegaard, Søren’ in Encyclopaedia of Political Theory, ed. Bevir, Mark, Sage, (2010).

References

External links
 Graham Smith at the University of Leeds

Living people
British political scientists
British political philosophers
Academics of Lancaster University
Academics of the University of Leeds
Kierkegaard scholars
Philosophers of love
Alumni of Lancaster University
1966 births
Alumni of the University of Sheffield
Nietzsche scholars